Manolis Glezos (9 September 1922 – 30 March 2020) was a Greek left-wing politician, journalist, author, and folk hero, best known for his participation in the World War II resistance.

In Greece, he is best remembered for taking down the Flag of Nazi Germany from the Acropolis during the Axis occupation of Greece, along with Lakis Santas. After the end of the Occupation, his left-wing political beliefs and activism led to him being sentenced to death thrice; his imprisonments and legal troubles were often the topic of international interest, until his permanent release in 1971.

Since the restoration of democracy in 1974, he had been active as a politician, becoming a Member of the Greek Parliament for various left-wing parties over the years. In 2014, at the age of 91, he became a Member of the European Parliament for a second time in his life, for Syriza, making him the oldest-ever member of the European Parliament. He was also the most voted-for candidate in Greece.

Glezos was an award-winning journalist, and worked as head-editor and editor for the left-wing newspapers Rizospastis and I Avgi, which are popular to this day; he also published six books.

Early life and World War II 
Born in the village of Apiranthos, Naxos, Glezos moved to Athens in 1935 together with his family, where he finished high school. During his high school years in Athens, he also worked as a pharmacy employee. He was admitted to the Higher School of Economic and Commercial Studies (known today as the Athens University of Economics and Business) in 1940. In 1939, still a high school student, Glezos participated in the creation of an anti-fascist youth group against the Italian occupation of the Dodecanese and the dictatorship of Ioannis Metaxas. At the onset of World War II, he volunteered to join the Greek army in the Albanian front against Italy but was rejected because he was underage. Instead, he worked as a volunteer for the Hellenic Ministry of Economics. During the Axis occupation of Greece, he worked for the Hellenic Red Cross and the municipality of Athens, while actively involved in the resistance.

According to popular tradition, on 27 April 1941 Konstantinos Koukidis was ordered to lower the Greek flag, and raise the Nazi swastika flag. Koukidis allegedly lowered the flag and jumped from the Acropolis holding it, rather than raise the Nazi flag.

On 30 May 1941 Glezos and Apostolos Santas climbed on the Acropolis and tore down the swastika, which had been there since 27 April 1941, when the Nazi forces had entered Athens. It inspired not only the Greeks, but all subjected people, to resist the occupation, and established them both as two international anti-Nazi heroes.

Hours later, the Nazi regime sentenced the perpetrators to death, but they were not identified until much later. Glezos was arrested by the German occupation forces on 24 March 1942, imprisoned, and tortured. As a result of his treatment, he was affected by tuberculosis.

Glezos was arrested again on 21 April 1943 by the Italian occupation forces and spent three months in jail. In 1944, he was imprisoned by Greek collaborators and beaten for trying to escape.

Career and political activism

Post-war period 

The end of World War II was not the end of Glezos' plight. On 3 March 1948, in the midst of the Greek Civil War, he was put to trial for his political convictions and sentenced to death multiple times by the national government. His death penalties were reduced to a life sentence in 1950. Even though he was still imprisoned, Manolis Glezos was elected member of the Hellenic Parliament in 1951, under the flag of the United Democratic Left, also known as EDA. Upon his election, he went on a hunger strike demanding the release of his fellow EDA MPs that were imprisoned or exiled in the Greek islands. He ended his hunger strike upon the release of 7 MPs from their exile. He was released from prison on 16 July 1954.

On 5 December 1958, he was arrested again and convicted of espionage, which was the common pretext for the persecution of the supporters of the left during the Cold War. The Soviet Union reacted circulating a postage stamp with Glezos, while the Greek government responded with a postage stamp depicting Imre Nagy. His release on 15 December 1962 was a result of the public outcry in Greece and abroad, including winning the Lenin Peace Prize. During his second term of post-war political imprisonment, Glezos was reelected MP with EDA in 1961. At the coup d'état of 21 April 1967, Glezos was arrested at 2 am, together with the rest of the political leaders. During the Regime of the Colonels, the military dictatorship led by George Papadopoulos, he was imprisoned and exiled until his release in 1971.

Manolis Glezos' sentences, from the Second World War to the Greek Civil War and the Regime of the Colonels total 11 years and 4 months of imprisonment, and 4 years and 6 months of exile.

Since 1974 
After the restoration of democracy in Greece in 1974, Glezos participated in the reviving of EDA. In the elections of October 1981 and June 1985, he was elected Member of the Greek Parliament, on a Panhellenic Socialist Movement (PASOK) ticket. In 1984 he was elected Member of the European Parliament, again on a PASOK ticket. He was the President of EDA from 1985 until 1989. In the meantime, in 1986, he withdrew from the Parliament, in order to try to implement a grassroots democracy experiment. He did so in the community of Aperathu, where he was elected as the President of the Community Council in 1986 elections. He then essentially abolished the privileges of the council, introducing a "constitution" and establishing a local assembly that had total control over the community administration. This model worked for several years, but in the long term the interest of the rest of his community wore off and the assembly was abandoned. Glezos remained the President until 1989.

In the 2000 Greek legislative election he led the list of Synaspismos (in English Coalition) party of the radical left. In 2002, he formed the political group Active Citizens (which is part of Coalition of the Radical Left, an alliance with Synaspismos and other minor parties of the Greek left) and he ran as a candidate prefect for Attica.

In March 2010, Glezos was participating in a protest demonstration in Athens, when he was hit in the face by a police tear gas canister. He was carried away injured.

In February 2012, Glezos was arrested by riot police while protesting in Athens. He was sprayed with tear gas by one of the police officers in that area.

In the June 2012 parliamentary election, Glezos was elected as MP of the Coalition of Radical Left (SYRIZA) party.

Glezos was a SYRIZA candidate for the European Parliament in the elections of 25 May 2014. He was elected to the European Parliament with over 430,000 votes, more than any other candidate in Greece. At age 91, he was also the oldest person elected to the European Parliament in the 2014 election.

In 2015, Glezos took a firm stance in favour of the "No" vote in the Greek bailout referendum. As an MEP he also participated in a support protest in Brussels, along with thousands of Belgians in favour of Greeks voting negatively in the referendum, a few days before the latter takes place. 
He resigned from his position in the European Parliament in July 2015, being succeeded by Nikolaos Chountis. The same year, he left SYRIZA before the September 2015 Greek election, where he was an MP candidate with the newly formed Popular Unity party.

In 2018, Manolis Glezos publicly voiced his opposition to the Prespa Agreement between Athens and Skopje on the resolution of the Macedonia naming dispute -despite the agreement being promoted by the SYRIZA government party which he formerly supported. In an article for the Greek daily paper Kathimerini, he insisted that the people of the neighbouring country should "define themselves in accordance with their history, language, traditions... taking out of their mind the word Macedonia".

Non-political career 
Apart from his political work, Glezos invented a system to prevent floods, combat erosion and preserve underground water, that works by the constructions of a series of very small dams that redirect water to aquifers. For his contributions to democracy, to geological sciences, and to linguistics he was pronounced honorary Doctor of Philosophy of the University of Patras (Department of Geology) in 1996, of the Aristotle University of Thessaloniki (Department of Civil Engineering) in 2001, of the National Technical University of Athens (School of Mining & Metallurgical Engineering) in 2003, and of the National and Kapodistrian University of Athens (School of Philosophy) in 2008.

Death

On 30 March 2020, Glezos died of heart failure, at the age of 97. Alexis Tsipras, former Greek prime-minister, said, "He will remain for all eternity the symbol of a fighter who knew how to sacrifice himself for the people." The Russian president Vladimir Putin sent a condolence message to the Greek government, which included, inter alia, the following words: "To his Excellency, PM Kyriakos Mitsotakis. May you accept [my] deep condolences for the loss of Manolis Glezos, a brilliant political and social figure of Greece and a hero of the Greek Resistance at World War II. Manolis Glezos was a true friend of our country [...] He [also] greatly contributed, in person, in the struggle against the distortion of history. [...] With honour, Vladimir Putin. Moscow Kremlin, April 1st, 2020"

Publications 
Glezos wrote articles in Greek newspapers since 1942 and was the editor of the newspapers Rizospastis and I Avgi in the 1950s. He was awarded the International Award of Journalism in 1958, the Golden Medal Joliot-Curie of the World Peace Council in 1959, and the Lenin Peace Prize in 1963. He published six books in Greek:
 The History of the Book (Η ιστορία του βιβλίου, 1974)
 From Dictatorship to Democracy (Από τη Δικτατορία στη ∆ηµοκρατία, 1974)
 The Phenomenon of Alienation in the Language (Το φαινόµενο της αλλοτρίωσης στη γλώσσα, 1977)
 The Conscience of the Rocky Earth, (Η συνείδηση της πετραίας γης, 1997)
 Hydor, Aura, Nero, (Ύδωρ, Αύρα, Νερό, 2001)
 National Resistance 1940-1945, (Εθνική Αντίσταση 1940-1945, 2006)

References

External links 

 

1922 births
2020 deaths
Athens University of Economics and Business alumni
Greek journalists
Greek prisoners and detainees
People convicted of treason against Greece
Prisoners sentenced to death by Greece
Greek People's Liberation Army personnel
Greek MPs 1958–1961
Greek MPs 1961–1963
Greek MPs 1981–1985
Greek MPs 1985–1989
Greek MPs 2012 (May)
Greek MPs 2012–2014
Greek non-fiction writers
Lenin Peace Prize recipients
MEPs for Greece 1984–1989
MEPs for Greece 2014–2019
PASOK MEPs
People from Naxos
Syriza MEPs
United Democratic Left politicians
Greek communists
20th-century Greek male writers
20th-century journalists
Male non-fiction writers